Lisseth Johanna Orozco Pallares (born September 1, 1986 in Cúcuta, Norte de Santander) is a female judoka from Colombia, who won the bronze medal in the women's extra lightweight division (– 48 kg) at the 2003 Pan American Games in Santo Domingo, Dominican Republic. She represented her native country at the 2004 Summer Olympics in Athens, Greece.

References

1986 births
Living people
Colombian female judoka
Olympic judoka of Colombia
Judoka at the 2004 Summer Olympics
Pan American Games bronze medalists for Colombia
Pan American Games medalists in judo
Judoka at the 2003 Pan American Games
Central American and Caribbean Games silver medalists for Colombia
Central American and Caribbean Games bronze medalists for Colombia
Competitors at the 2006 Central American and Caribbean Games
South American Games gold medalists for Colombia
South American Games medalists in judo
Competitors at the 2006 South American Games
Central American and Caribbean Games medalists in judo
Medalists at the 2003 Pan American Games
People from Cúcuta
21st-century Colombian women